Jordan Coghlan (born 30 October 1992) is an Irish rugby union player who is currently unattached. His preferred position is flanker. He has previously played for Nottingham in the RFU Championship, Leicester Tigers in Premiership Rugby as well as Leinster and Munster in Ireland.

Career

Leinster
Coghlan made his Leinster debut on 8 September 2012, coming off the bench against Dragons. He was part of the Leinster A team that won the British and Irish Cup in 2013.

Munster
Coghlan made his Munster debut on 13 September 2015, coming off the bench against Ospreys in the second game of the 2015–16 Pro12. He scored his first try for Munster in the 35-27 win against Cardiff Blues on 17 October 2015. Coghlan made his first start for Munster against Scarlets on 23 October 2015.

Nottingham
Ahead of the 2016–17 season, Coghlan left Munster to join English RFU Championship side Nottingham.

Leicester Tigers
Coghlan joined Premiership Rugby side Leicester Tigers ahead of the 2019–20 season.  He featured in 11 games before his release from the club was announced on 16 June 2021.

Loan to Nottingham
Coghlan returned to former club Nottingham on loan from parent club Leicester Tigers in January 2020.

Ireland
Coghlan represented Ireland Under-20s at the 2012 IRB Junior World Championship, scoring a try against South Africa Under-20s and England Under-20s.

References

External links
Nottingham Profile
Munster Profile
Leinster Academy Profile
Ireland U20 Profile

Living people
1992 births
Rugby union players from Dublin (city)
University College Dublin R.F.C. players
Irish rugby union players
Leinster Rugby players
Munster Rugby players
Nottingham R.F.C. players
Leicester Tigers players
Rugby union flankers
Irish expatriate sportspeople in England
Irish expatriate rugby union players
Expatriate rugby union players in England